Chymopapain S may refer to one of two enzymes:
Chymopapain
Caricain